Monarch Cove is a prime time telenovela that premiered on Lifetime on November 4, 2006. It ran for 14 episodes, ending on December 16, 2006.

Premise
After serving six years in jail for the murder of her father, wrongfully accused Bianca Foster (Virginia Williams) returns to her hometown, Monarch Cove.

The series is based on the German serial Bianca – Wege zum Glück (Bianca: Paths to Happiness). It was produced by FremantleMedia North America, a sister company of UFA, which produced the original.

Cast
Actor (Character)
Virginia Williams (Bianca Foster)
Samantha Shelton (Kathy Foster)
Shirley Jones (Grace Foster)
Matt Funke (Ben Foster)
Kieren Hutchison (Jake Preston)
Robert Coleby (Alexander Preston)
Rachel Ward (Arianna Preston)
Vanessa Lengies (Sophia Preston)
Simon Rex (Eddie Lucas)
Samantha Healy (Elizabeth DeBrett)
Stephen Martines (Parker Elian)
Craig Horner (Caleb)

External links
  (Retrieved from Internet Archive on February 8, 2008)
 

2000s American drama television series
2006 telenovelas
2006 American television series debuts
2006 American television series endings
American telenovelas
American television series based on telenovelas
Lifetime (TV network) original programming
Television series by Fremantle (company)
Television shows set in Gold Coast, Queensland